Liu Xiaoqing (born 30 October 1955)  is a Chinese actress and businesswoman. She was one of the leading actresses in China in the 1980s.

Biography
In her early days Liu worked as a farm labourer, then as a propagandist for the People's Liberation Army and later a stage actor for the Chengdu Military Drama Group.

Liu acted in mainland Chinese films before she turned 30—The Great Wall of the South China Sea (1976), What a Family (1979) and The Little Flower (1980). Her breakthrough role was the ruthless Qing dynasty Empress Dowager Cixi in The Burning of the Imperial Palace (1983) and Reign Behind the Curtain (1984). Her portrayal of Cixi won her numerous awards in Chinese film festivals and she later reprised the role in two unrelated films, including Li Lianying: The Imperial Eunuch (1991). She won Best Actress at the Hundred Flowers Award for her role as Hua Jinzhi in The Savage Land, filmed in 1981 but not released until 1987, and again for her role in Hibiscus Town (1986). She holds a record for having won the most number of awards in the actress categories of the Hundred Flowers Award, with three Best Actress and one Best Supporting Actress.

Liu left the entertainment industry in the 1990s to focus on business, but later returned to acting in the mid 2000s. One of her latest films was Chunhua (also titled Plastic Flower, released in 2004), in which she played the titular role, Chunhua. She performed in a stage play, The Last Night of Tapan Chin, in China and Taiwan from 2005 to 2008.

Liu published a short autobiography I Did It My Way in 1983. She became one of the richest people in China, appearing at 45 on Forbes' list of the 50 richest Chinese businessmen and businesswomen in 1999. She promoted her success by publishing a book titled From A Movie Star to A Billionaire. She was arrested for tax evasion in connection with her company, Beijing Xiaoqing Culture and Arts Company Ltd., in 2002, was fined 7.1 million yuan (to accommodate money for the fine, she was forced to sell some of her possessions), and imprisoned for a year.

In 2012 Liu Xiaoqing played Sai Jinhua in a performance of the play The Beauty (S: 风华绝代, T: 風華絕代, P: Fēnghuá Juédài).

Filmography

Film

Television

References

External links
 
 - essay about Mao Zedong

Actresses from Chongqing
1951 births
Living people
Writers from Chongqing
Chinese autobiographers
People's Republic of China writers
Businesspeople from Chongqing
Chinese film actresses
Chinese television actresses
20th-century Chinese actresses
21st-century Chinese actresses
Women autobiographers
Chinese people convicted of tax crimes